Tiago Splitter Beims (born January 1, 1985) is a Brazilian former professional basketball player who played seven seasons in the National Basketball Association (NBA). He is currently serving as player development coach for the Brooklyn Nets. A three-time All-EuroLeague Team selection prior to his NBA career, he became the first Brazilian-born player to win an NBA championship, in 2014, as a member of the San Antonio Spurs.

Early life
Splitter was born in Joinville, Brazil.

Professional career

Brazil and Spain (1999–2010)
Splitter began his professional career in 1999. In 2000, he began to play in Spain's top-level league, the Liga ACB. In 2004, Splitter became a naturalised citizen of Spain. Splitter was named the MVP of the Spanish Supercup tournament in both 2006 and 2007. He was also named to the All-EuroLeague First Team for the EuroLeague's 2007–08 season, after helping Saski Baskonia make it to the 2008 EuroLeague Final Four. The following year, Splitter reached the EuroLeague 2008–09 season's playoffs, but failed to make another EuroLeague Final Four participation. Nevertheless, his performances earned him a spot on the 2008–09 All-EuroLeague Second Team. Splitter was named the Spanish League MVP in 2010.

Splitter was expected to declare for the 2006 NBA Draft, but because the expensive buyout of his contract discouraged NBA teams with high draft picks from drafting him, he remained in the Spanish ACB League for that season.  Splitter was automatically eligible for the 2007 NBA Draft, as he was at least 22 years of age at the time of the draft. He was selected by the San Antonio Spurs, in the first round of the draft, with the 28th overall draft pick.

On May 28, 2008, ESPN Brasil reported that Splitter had re-signed with Saski Baskonia, on a two-year contract that would keep him in the Spanish ACB League through the 2009–10 NBA season. The contract allowed the Brazilian to make 8 times more than the NBA rookie scale salary cap would have allowed him to make with the San Antonio Spurs at that time. On June 7, 2008, the San Antonio Express-News reported that Spurs General Manager R.C. Buford, had stated that Splitter had informed the team that he would not be coming to San Antonio for the 2008–09 NBA season.

Splitter had instead signed an extension with Saski Baskonia, that would keep him in the Spanish ACB League through 2010. It was announced on July 9, 2010, that Splitter had opted out of his contract with Saski Baskonia, in order to sign in the NBA with the San Antonio Spurs.

San Antonio Spurs (2010–2015)
On July 12, 2010, Splitter signed a contract with the San Antonio Spurs. The deal was believed to be worth $11 million over 3 years.

He earned his first start of his NBA career on March 19, against the Charlotte Bobcats, in place of the injured Tim Duncan. In this game, Splitter recorded 8 points and 6 rebounds.

On February 8, 2012, Splitter and teammate Kawhi Leonard, were selected to play in the 2012 Rising Stars Challenge. On February 17, it was revealed that both Splitter and Leonard would be teammates for Team Chuck. However, due to an injury, he was released from Team Chuck and was replaced by Derrick Favors.

On May 29, 2012, in Game 2 of the Western Conference Finals, Oklahoma City Thunder head coach Scott Brooks, attempted to slow San Antonio's offense through continual the fouling of Splitter, sending him to the free throw line with the "Hack-a-Shaq" strategy.

He played his most productive season with the Spurs in 2012–13 NBA season, averaging 10.3 points and 6.4 rebounds per game, while playing all but the final game of the regular season. He started 58 games, as the Spurs finished the West in the two-seed, behind the Oklahoma City Thunder. The Spurs would advance to the 2013 NBA Finals, only to lose to the Miami Heat in seven games, as Miami won their second straight NBA championship.

On July 13, 2013, he re-signed with the Spurs. On June 15, 2014, Splitter won his first NBA championship, after the Spurs defeated the Miami Heat, 4 games to 1 in the 2014 NBA Finals.

After missing 20 out of the first 21 games of the 2014–15 season with a back injury, Splitter played out the rest of the season, until missing the final six games of the regular season, with a calf injury. He returned for the playoffs, but the Spurs were knocked out in the first round by the Los Angeles Clippers, in seven games.

Atlanta Hawks (2015–2017)
On July 9, 2015, Splitter was traded to the Atlanta Hawks, in exchange for the draft rights to Georgios Printezis, and a future second-round pick. On February 16, 2016, he was ruled out for the rest of the season, after electing to have surgery to repair his right hip.

On October 11, 2016, Splitter was ruled out for four weeks with a grade 2 hamstring strain. He was ruled out for a further six weeks, on November 26, after an MRI exam revealed a grade 2 right calf strain.

Philadelphia 76ers (2017)
On February 22, 2017, Splitter was traded, along with a second-round draft pick, to the Philadelphia 76ers, in exchange for Ersan İlyasova. On March 21, 2017, he was assigned to the Delaware 87ers, the 76ers' D-League affiliate. He was recalled six days later. On March 28, 2017, he made his debut for the 76ers, recording two points and three rebounds, in seven minutes of playing time, in a 106–101 win over the Brooklyn Nets. Splitter, who had been nursing a right calf injury, entered the game late in the first quarter, and played in his first game since January 31, 2016, when he was a member of the Atlanta Hawks, before undergoing hip surgery. He played a handful of games with a prosthetic hip.

Retirement
On February 19, 2018, Splitter announced his retirement from playing professional basketball, due to a hip injury that had hindered the back-end of his career.

National team career
Splitter won gold medals with the senior Brazilian national basketball team at the 2003 FIBA South American Championship, the 2003 Pan American Games, the 2005 FIBA AmeriCup, the 2009 FIBA AmeriCup, and the silver medal in 2011 FIBA AmeriCup. With Brazil, he also played at the 2002 FIBA World Cup, the 2006 FIBA World Cup, the 2010 FIBA World Cup, the 2012 Summer Olympics, and the 2014 FIBA World Cup.

Coaching career
On April 24, 2018, Splitter was hired by the Brooklyn Nets, as a pro scout, with added duties related to on-court player development. On September 23, 2019, he was promoted by the Nets to player development coach.

In 2021, Splitter was named an assistant coach of the Brazilian national team.

In 2022, Splitter was the head coach of the Brazilian U23 national team at the GLOBL Jam Tournament in Toronto, Canada, where the team won the gold medal.

Personal life
Splitter is the son of Cassio and Elisabeth Splitter. He was raised a Christian, although his father is of Jewish descent. In 2009, Splitter's sister Michelle, also a basketball player, died of leukemia, at the age of 19. In 2017, Splitter married his wife, Fernanda.

Career statistics

EuroLeague

|-
| style="text-align:left;"| 2003–04
| style="text-align:left;"| Tau Cerámica
| 16 || 1 || 11.2 || .619 || .000 || .632 || 2.4 || .3 || .4 || .3 || 4.0 || 3.9
|-
| style="text-align:left;"| 2004–05
| style="text-align:left;"| Tau Cerámica
| 19 || 2 || 17.8 || .533 || .000 || .487 || 4.5 || .9 || .7 || .7 || 7.0 || 7.6
|-
| style="text-align:left;"| 2005–06
| style="text-align:left;"| Tau Cerámica
| 24 || 11 || 21.6 || .599 || .000 || .547 || 4.6 || .6 || 1.3 || .5 || 9.5 || 10.8
|-
| style="text-align:left;"| 2006–07
| style="text-align:left;"| Tau Cerámica
| 20 || 12 || 24.7 || .580 || .000 || .529 || 6.0 || .8 || 1.4 || .3 || 10.7 || 13.2
|-
| style="text-align:left;"| 2007–08
| style="text-align:left;"| Tau Cerámica
| 25 || 13 || 22.5 || .618 || .000 || .645 || 5.0 || 1.1 || 1.0 || .8 || 14.0 || 16.1
|-
| style="text-align:left;"| 2008–09
| style="text-align:left;"| Tau Cerámica
| 17 || 12 || 24.7 || .655 || .000 || .602 || 5.4 || 1.6 || .6 || 1.6 || 14.0 || 17.8
|-
| style="text-align:left;"| 2009–10
| style="text-align:left;"| Caja Laboral
| 16 || 14 || 26.7 || .535 || .000 || .636 || 5.4 || 1.8 || .8 || .5 || 13.0 || 15.8
|- class="sortbottom"
| style="text-align:left;"| Career
| style="text-align:left;"|
| 137 || 65 || 21.5 || .593 || .000 || .582 || 4.8 || 1.0 || .9 || .7 || 10.5 || 12.3

NBA regular season

|-
| style="text-align:left;"| 
| style="text-align:left;"| San Antonio
| 60 || 6 || 12.3 || .529 || .000 || .543 || 3.4 || .4 || .5 || .3 || 4.6
|-
| style="text-align:left;"| 
| style="text-align:left;"| San Antonio
| 59 || 2 || 19.0 || .618 || .000 || .691 || 5.2 || 1.1 || .4 || .8 || 9.3
|-
| style="text-align:left;"| 
| style="text-align:left;"| San Antonio
| 81 || 58 || 24.7 || .560 || .000 || .730 || 6.4 || 1.6 || .8 || .8 || 10.3
|-
| style="text-align:left;background:#afe6ba;"| †
| style="text-align:left;"| San Antonio
| 59 || 50 || 21.5 || .523 || .000 || .699 || 6.2 || 1.5 || .5 || .5 || 8.2
|-
| style="text-align:left;"| 
| style="text-align:left;"| San Antonio
| 52 || 35 || 19.8 || .558 || .000 || .750 || 4.8 || 1.5 || .7 || .7 || 8.2
|-
| style="text-align:left;"| 
| style="text-align:left;"| Atlanta
| 36 || 2 || 16.1 || .523 || .000 || .813 || 3.3 || .8 || .6 || .3 || 5.6
|-
| style="text-align:left;"| 
| style="text-align:left;"| Philadelphia
| 8 || 0 || 9.5 || .452 || .333 || .818 || 2.8 || .5 || .1 || .1 || 4.9
|- class="sortbottom"
| style="text-align:center;" colspan="2"| Career
| 355 || 153 || 19.2 || .555 || .143 || .697 || 5.0 || 1.2 || .6 || .6 || 7.9

NBA playoffs

|-
| style="text-align:left;"| 2011
| style="text-align:left;"| San Antonio
| 3 || 0 || 16.7 || .625 || .000 || .000 || 4.7 || .3 || 1.0 || .3 || 6.7
|-
| style="text-align:left;"| 2012
| style="text-align:left;"| San Antonio
| 13 || 0 || 12.9 || .638 || .000 || .372 || 2.8 || .8 || .4 || .3 || 5.8
|-
| style="text-align:left;"| 2013
| style="text-align:left;"| San Antonio
| 19 || 15 || 20.4 || .536 || .000 || .788 || 3.1 || 1.2 || .8 || .7 || 6.1
|-
| style="text-align:left;background:#afe6ba;"| 2014†
| align="left" | San Antonio
| 23 || 18 || 22.4 || .610 || .000 || .718 || 6.1 || 2.0 || .7 || .5 || 7.5
|-
| style="text-align:left;"| 2015
| style="text-align:left;"| San Antonio
| 7 || 7 || 17.6 || .375 || .000 || .316 || 4.4 || 1.3 || .6 || .1 || 3.4
|- class="sortbottom"
| style="text-align:center;" colspan="2"| Career
| 65 || 40 || 19.1 || .572 || .000 || .586 || 4.3 || 1.4 || .7 || .5 || 6.3

See also
List of select Jewish basketball players

References

External links

 
 Tiago Splitter at euroleague.net
 
 Tiago Splitter at acb.com 
 

1985 births
Living people
Atlanta Hawks players
Basketball players at the 2003 Pan American Games
Basketball players at the 2012 Summer Olympics
Bilbao Basket players
Brazilian basketball scouts
Brazilian emigrants to Spain
Brazilian expatriate basketball people in the United States
Brazilian expatriate basketball people in Spain
Brazilian men's basketball players
Brazilian people of German-Jewish descent
Brooklyn Nets scouts
Centers (basketball)
Delaware 87ers players
Jewish men's basketball players
Liga ACB players
National Basketball Association players from Brazil
Naturalised citizens of Spain
Olympic basketball players of Brazil
Pan American Games gold medalists for Brazil
Pan American Games medalists in basketball
People from Joinville
Philadelphia 76ers players
Power forwards (basketball)
San Antonio Spurs draft picks
San Antonio Spurs players
Saski Baskonia players
Valencia Basket players
Spanish people of German-Jewish descent
2014 FIBA Basketball World Cup players
2010 FIBA World Championship players
2006 FIBA World Championship players
2002 FIBA World Championship players
Medalists at the 2003 Pan American Games
Sportspeople from Santa Catarina (state)